Luna 6, or E-6 No.7 (Ye-6 series) was an uncrewed Soviet spacecraft which was intended to perform a landing on the Moon as part of the Luna program.

Launch
Luna 6 was launched by a Molniya-M carrier rocket flying from Site 1/5 at the Baikonur Cosmodrome. Liftoff occurred at 07:40 UTC on 8 June 1965, with the spacecraft and Blok L upper stage entering a low Earth parking orbit, before the upper stage propelled the spacecraft into a heliocentric orbit passing the Moon.

Failure
The Luna 6 mission proceeded as planned until a scheduled mid-course correction late on 9 June. Although the spacecraft's S5.5A main engine ignited on time, it failed to cut off and continued to fire until its propellant supply was exhausted. An investigation later determined that the problem had been due to a command which had been mistakenly sent to the timer that ordered the main engine to shut down.

Despite the spacecraft being unable to land on the Moon, controllers used the spacecraft to simulate a landing; a task which was satisfactorily accomplished.

References

External links

 Zarya - Luna programme chronology

Luna 06
Spacecraft launched in 1965
1965 in the Soviet Union
Spacecraft launched by Molniya-M rockets
Derelict satellites in heliocentric orbit